A Tokyo Siren (also known as A Tokio Siren) is a 1920 American silent drama film directed by Norman Dawn and starring Tsuru Aoki, Jack Livingston, Goro Kino, Toyo Fujita and Arthur Jasmine. The film was based on Gwendolyn Logan's story "Cayonara."

Plot
A young American doctor is in Tokyo trying to heal his heartbreak after being jilted by his lover. Just as he is about to return to his home country, he decides to help a young Japanese woman escape a bad situation by making her legally his wife. When the doctor arrives in America, his former lover returns, and is sad to find that he is married. Meanwhile, the young woman begins to fall for the doctor's Japanese assistant.

Cast

 Tsuru Aoki as Asuti Hishuri
 Jack Livingston (billed as Jack Livingstone) as Dr. Niblock
 Goro Kino as Hakami
 Toyo Fujita as Hishuri
 Arthur Jasmine as Ito
 Peggy Pearce as Ethel
 Florence Hart as Amelia Niblock
 Frederick Vroom as Mr. Chandler
 Dorothy Hipp as Matsu

References

External links 
 

1920 films
American silent feature films
1920 drama films
Silent American drama films
Films directed by Norman Dawn
Universal Pictures films
American black-and-white films
1920s American films